(ADP-ribosyl)hydrolase 2 (ARH2) is a protein that in humans is encoded by the ADPRHL1 gene.

Function 

Proteins of the ADP-ribosylhydrolase family are typically associated with the reversal of ADP-ribosylation a posttranslational modification used to regulate protein function. However, ARH2 misses catalytically important residues and is predicted to be catalytically inactive. ARH2 is a cardiac-specific protein and expressed exclusively in the developing heart of vertebrates. Gene loss and loss-of-function mutations are associated with defective heart chamber growth and myofibrillogenesis.

See also 

 ADP-ribosylhydrolase

References

Further reading